Jakob Orlov (born 15 March 1986) is a retired Swedish footballer who played as a striker.

Career
In January 2014, Orlov moved to the Tippeligaen, signing for Brann. Previously Orlov had joined Gefle in 2010 after having become the second best goalscorer of the 2009 Division 1 Södra season. In August 2015, Orlov completed a season long loan deal with Swedish side Hammarby, with winger Amadaiya Rennie moving the opposite way.

On 8 February 2020, 33-year old Orlov announced his retirement.

Career statistics

References

External links
Gefle IF Profile 

Eliteprospects Profile

1986 births
Living people
Swedish footballers
Association football forwards
Allsvenskan players
Superettan players
Gefle IF players
SK Brann players
Hammarby Fotboll players
Jönköpings Södra IF players
Swedish people of Russian descent
Skövde AIK players
Eliteserien players
Norwegian First Division players
Swedish expatriate footballers
Expatriate footballers in Norway
Swedish expatriate sportspeople in Norway
People from Skövde Municipality
Sportspeople from Västra Götaland County